Tayra Meléndez (born 29 October 1993) is a Puerto Rican basketball player for Gigantes de Carolina  and the Puerto Rican national team.

She participated at the 2018 FIBA Women's Basketball World Cup.

Statistics

Source

References

External links

1993 births
Living people
Basketball players at the 2019 Pan American Games
Basketball players at the 2020 Summer Olympics
Basketball players from Massachusetts
Forwards (basketball)
Olympic basketball players of Puerto Rico
Pan American Games medalists in basketball
Puerto Rican women's basketball players
Rhode Island Rams women's basketball players
Pan American Games bronze medalists for Puerto Rico
Medalists at the 2019 Pan American Games